Rubellia Bassa (born between 33-38) was a daughter of Gaius Rubellius Blandus, consul in AD 18 and possibly his wife Julia Livia (killed 43) but more probably an earlier wife.

Possible imperial ancestry

It has been theorized that her mother was Julia Livia (daughter of Drusus Julius Caesar and Livilla), which would make Bassa the great-granddaughter of Tiberius and the great-great-niece of Augustus through his sister Octavia the Younger; however, this lineage is uncertain because her father, Gaius Rubellius Blandus married Julia when he was around 55, which makes an earlier marriage likely (possibly to a Laecania Bassa), and Rubellia Bassa may have been the daughter of Blandus by this theorized earlier marriage.

Bassa had at least one sibling or half-sibling, a brother named Gaius Rubellius Plautus who was one of the nearest heirs of the blood of Tiberius, being the grandson of Drusus Julius Caesar. Plautus was forced to kill himself in 62 and his wife Antistia Pollitta and children were executed four years later, perhaps because the children were direct descendants of previous Roman Emperors.

Marriage and possible descendants
Rubellia Bassa married Gaius Octavius Laenas, maternal uncle of the future emperor Nerva. Ronald Syme claims that Sergius Octavius Laenas Pontianus, consul in 131 under Emperor Hadrian, set up a dedication to his grandmother, "[Rub]elliae / [Bla]ndi f(iliae) Bassae / Octavi Laenatis / Sergius Octavius / Laenas Pontianus / aviae optimae ". This obscure link is perhaps a continuation of the Julio-Claudian bloodline through the 2nd century.

See also
 List of Roman women

References

30s births
Year of death unknown
1st-century Roman women
Rubellii